Ot Danum (also known as Dohoi, Malahoi, Uud Danum or Uut Danum) people are a subethnicity of the Dayak people (hence also referred as Dayak Ot Danum) dwelling at the upper reaches of south Kapuas River, and along the Schwaner range, bordering West Kalimantan and Central Kalimantan, Indonesia. They are the most important group of the upper Melawi River and culturally and linguistically the most distinct from the Malay people. Besides, the Malay people, the Ot Danum people are also linguistically distinct from the Ngaju people who live along the middle reaches of Central Kalimantan's great rivers and who are numerically and linguistically the dominant Dayak people group in the area. Just like most Dayak people group, majority of the Ot Danum people also practice Kaharingan religion.

The word Ot means people or upstream, while the word Danum means water. Therefore, the name Ot Danum means "water people" or "upriver people" or "people who live at the upstream river". The Ot Danum people are closely tied to living with nature and would revere the traditions of their ancestors by taking care of the balance between mankind and the surrounding nature.

References

Ethnic groups in Indonesia
Kalimantan
Dayak people